Lord Percy is the name of:

Baron Percy created firstly in 1066, a title associated though not exclusively with the Earls of Northumberland and their predecessors
Earl Percy, a subsidiary title of the Duke of Northumberland used as a courtesy by the Duke's heir
Eustace Percy, 1st Baron Percy of Newcastle (1887–1958), British diplomat
Hugh Percy, 2nd Duke of Northumberland (1742-1817), British general during the American Revolutionary War.
Lord Percy Percy, fictional character in the British comedy series, Blackadder
Lord Henry Percy (1817–1877), VC KCB (22 August 1817 – 3 December 1877) was an English recipient of the Victoria Cross, the highest and most prestigious award for gallantry in the face of the enemy that can be awarded to British and Commonwealth forces
Lord Josceline Percy (1811–1881)
Lord Algernon Percy (1851–1933), British career soldier and Conservative politician who sat in the House of Commons from 1882 to 1887
Lord Percy Seymour